The NBR A Class (London and North Eastern Railway (LNER) Classes N14 and N15 were the standard 0-6-2 tank locomotives designed by William P. Reid for freight duties on the North British Railway. The LNER regarded the original locomotives as two separate classes (N14 & N15). The final batch of locomotives was on order at the time of the grouping in 1923.

History

N14 Class
They were built by the North British Locomotive Company and numbered 858-863. They were withdrawn 1947-1954.

N15/1 Class
Fifty three similar locomotives were built by the North British Locomotive Company between June 1910 March 1917 with longer cabs but shorter bunkers. They were fitted with Steam brakes and used on Freight duties. A further batch of ten locomotives was built by North British Locomotive Company in February and March 1920. A third batch of ten was on order from Robert Stephenson and Company when the North British Railway became a constituent of the LNER. They were delivered between January and March 1923. Two of these locomotives were later fitted with Westinghouse brakes in 1929 and were re-classified N15/2. The remainder were withdrawn between 1957 and 1962.

N15/2 Class
Six N15/1 locomotives were built by the North British Locomotive Company with Westinghouse brakes in 1910. They were used to bank passenger trains up the 1 in 42 Cowlairs incline leading from  Glasgow Queen Street railway station. Prior to 1910 trains had been rope hauled by a stationary engine. A further two N15/1 were converted to N15/2 in 1929.

References

External links

NBR/LNER Reid "N14" Class 0-6-2T at BRDatabase
NBR/LNER Reid "N15" Class 0-6-2T at BRDatabase

A
0-6-2T locomotives
Railway locomotives introduced in 1909
Railway locomotives introduced in 1910
Scrapped locomotives
Standard gauge steam locomotives of Great Britain
NBL locomotives
Robert Stephenson and Company locomotives
Freight locomotives